The 1952 United States presidential election in South Dakota took place on November 4, 1952, as part of the 1952 United States presidential election. Voters chose four representatives, or electors, to the Electoral College, who voted for president and vice president.

South Dakota was won by Columbia University President Dwight D. Eisenhower (R–New York), running with California Senator Richard Nixon, with 69.27 percent of the popular vote, against Illinois Governor Adlai Stevenson II (D), running with Alabama Senator John Sparkman, with 30.73 percent of the popular vote.

With 69.27% of the popular vote, South Dakota would be Eisenhower's third strongest state after Vermont and neighboring North Dakota.

, this is the last election in which Oglala Lakota County, known until 2015 as Shannon County and home to the Pine Ridge Indian Reservation, voted for a Republican presidential candidate. This is also the last time any presidential candidate has won every single county in the state.

This was also the last time Armstrong County participated in a presidential election, as the county was abolished and absorbed into the Southern portion of Dewey County.

Results

Results by county

See also
 United States presidential elections in South Dakota

References

South Dakota
1952
1952 South Dakota elections